Allar may refer to:
 Allar language
 Allar, Jalilabad, Azerbaijan
 Allar, Yardymli, Azerbaijan
 Allar, Jerusalem, a  Palestinian village depopulated in 1948

People with the given name
 Allar (given name)

People with the surname
 Erica Allar (born 1985), American cyclist